Rick Talan (3 November 1960 – 30 September 2015) was a Dutch football player.

Club career
A pacy striker, Talan started his career with local amateur side Katwijk and joined AZ'67 in 1978. He scored 44 goals in 95 official matches for the club and was part of the squad that won the club's first Eredivisie title in 1981. In the 1983–84 Eredivisie season he scored 20 goals in 33 league games for AZ. In 1982, he played half a year for Belgian side Cercle Brugge, scoring twice in 14 official matches.

He finishes his career in 1988 after playing almost 100 games with Vitesse Arnhem.

Personal life and death
Talan's younger brother Jeffrey also became a professional footballer and earned 8 senior caps for the Netherlands. Talan owned an accountancy company in Zevenaar.

Rick Talan suffered from a brain tumor in 2007 and underwent two operations. The tumor however returned a year later and he died in September 2015.

Honours
 Eredivisie
Winners (1):  1981

References

1960 births
2015 deaths
Footballers from Katwijk
Association football forwards
Dutch footballers
Dutch people of Indonesian descent
VV Katwijk players
AZ Alkmaar players
Cercle Brugge K.S.V. players
HFC Haarlem players
SBV Vitesse players
Eredivisie players
Eerste Divisie players
Dutch expatriate footballers
Expatriate footballers in Belgium
Belgian Pro League players
Deaths from brain tumor